His Master's Voice (original Polish title: Głos Pana) is a 1960s science fiction novel written by Polish writer Stanisław Lem. It was first published in 1968 and translated into English by Michael Kandel in 1983. The book incorporates a "message from space" theme. It is a densely philosophical first contact story about an effort by scientists to decode, translate, and understand an extraterrestrial transmission. The novel critically approaches humanity's intelligence and intentions in deciphering and truly comprehending a message from outer space. It is considered to be one of the three best-known books by Lem, the other two being Solaris and The Cyberiad.

Plot 

The novel is written as a first-person narrative, the memoir of a mathematician named Peter Hogarth, who becomes involved in a Pentagon-directed project (code-named "His Master's Voice", or HMV for short) somewhere in the Nevada desert, where scientists are working to decode what seems to be a message from outer space (specifically, a neutrino signal from the  Canis Minor constellation). Throughout the book Hogarth—or rather, Lem himself—exposes the reader to many debates merging cosmology and philosophy: from discussions of epistemology, systems theory, information theory and probability, through the idea of evolutionary biology and the possible form and motives of extraterrestrial intelligence, with digressions about ethics in military-sponsored research, to the limitations of human science constrained by the human nature subconsciously projecting itself into the analysis of any unknown subject. At some point one of the involved scientists (Rappaport), desperate for new ideas, even begins to read and discuss popular science-fiction stories, and Lem uses this opportunity to criticize the science fiction genre, as Rappaport soon becomes bored and disillusioned by monotonous plots and the unimaginative stories of pulp magazines.

Before Hogarth's arrival, the scientists were able to use part of the data to synthesize a substance with unusual properties. Two variations had been created: a viscous liquid nicknamed "Frog Eggs", and a more solid version that looks like a slab of red meat called "Lord of the Flies" (named for its strange agitating effect on insects brought into proximity with it). There is some speculation that the signal may actually be a genome and that "Frog Eggs" and "Lord of the Flies" may be a form of protoplasm; possibly that of the alien creatures that presumably sent the signal. This theory, like all the project's theories about the signal, turns out to be unverifiable.

For a short time, Hogarth suspects that the message may have a military use, and is faced with an ethical dilemma about whether and how to pursue this angle. "Frog eggs" seems to enable a teleportation of an atomic blast at the speed of light to a remote location, which would make deterrence impossible. Hogarth and the discoverer of the effect decide to conduct further research in secret before notifying the military. Eventually, they conclude that there is no military use after all (which Hogarth sees as a proof of the Senders' far-sightedness), since the uncertainty of the blast location increases with distance. The two scientists face ostracism from their colleagues, some of whom consider their conduct unpatriotic.

Some of the scientists pursue a theory that the neutrino signal might have had the effect of increasing the likelihood that life would develop on the planet eons ago. They are forced to consider whether alien beings sent the signal for this very reason. In the end, they find no certain answers.

There is much speculation about the nature of whatever alien beings might have sent the signal. They must have been technologically superior, but no one can be sure whether they were virtuous or evil. Indeed, as the signal must have been sent long ago, no one can be sure whether they still exist.

The theories the scientists come up with all seem to make some progress toward deciphering the signal; however, as is stated in the few first pages of Hogarth's memoirs, for all their efforts, the scientists are left with few new, real discoveries. By the time the project is ended, they are no more sure than they were in the beginning about whether the signal was a message from intelligent beings that humanity failed to decipher, or a poorly understood natural phenomenon.

In the end, the many theories about the signal and the beings who might have sent it say more about the scientists (and humanity) than about the signal (and the beings who might have sent it).  The comparison between the signal and a Rorschach test is made more than once.

Literary criticism
Dave Langford reviewed His Master's Voice for White Dwarf #49, and stated that "Lem offers a sheaf of cosmic answers, some truly mindblowing – but it isn't easy reading."

The book can be viewed on many levels: as part of the social science fiction genre criticizing  Cold War military and political decision-making as corrupting the ethical conduct of scientists; as a psychological and philosophical essay on the limitations of the human mind facing the unknown; or as a satire of "men of science" and their thinking. The critique of the idea of 'pure science' is also a critique of the positivist approach: Lem argues that no scientist can be detached from the pressures of the outside world. The book is deeply philosophical, and there is relatively little action; most of the book consists of philosophical essays, monologues and dialogues.

Other Lem's novels exploring the issues of first contact are Eden, Solaris, The Invincible and Fiasco. His Master's Voice, however, is one of Lem's more philosophical books.

Reviews
Review by Faren Miller (1983) in Locus, #268 May 1983
Review by Ann Collier (1984) in Vector 118
Review by Christopher Pike (1984) in Foundation, #31 July 1984
Review by George Zebrowski (1987) in Fantasy Review, July-August 1987
Review by Norman Beswick (1991) in Paperback Inferno, #88
Review by James Schellenberg (1998) in Challenging Destiny Number 3, July 1998

Translations and derivative works
Głos Pana was translated from Polish into Chinese, Czech, English, Finnish, French, Georgian, German, Hungarian, Italian, Japanese, Latvian, Portuguese, Romanian, Russian, Serbian, Slovak and Spanish.

English translation: Stanisław Lem, His Master's Voice, translated by Michael Kandel, 1983, Harcourt Brace Jovanovich,  (1st edition, hardcover)

In 2018, Hungarian filmmaker György Pálfi released the film (in Hungarian, available with English subtitles)   Az Úr hangja ("The Lord's Voice"/"The Master's Voice") loosely  based on Lem's novel.

Portuguese translation: «A Voz do Dono», translated by Teresa Fernandes Swiatkiewicz, 2023, Antígona.

See also

References

External links 
 Entry on Lem's official page, English version
 Entry on Lem's official page, Polish version 
 Irina Rodnianskaia, Two Faces of Stanislaw Lem: On His Master's Voice. (abstract) Science Fiction Studies #40 = Volume 13, Part 3 = November 1986,  (originally published in Russian in Novy Mir, no.2, 1973, pp. 272–278
 Article in Science Fiction Studies (#123=Volume 41, Part 2, July 2014) by Adam Głaz: "Rorschach, We Have a Problem! The Linguistics of First Contact in Watts’s Blindsight and Lem’s His Master’s Voice"
 His Master Voice review in NYT

1968 novels
Novels by Stanisław Lem
Novels set in Nevada
Philosophical novels
1968 science fiction novels
Czytelnik books
Polish novels adapted into films